Master Tape Theatre is a radio show that broadcasts uncensored versions of The Howard Stern Show on Howard 101 on Sundays at 3:00pm (Eastern Time) on Howard 101. Each episode is presented as a moment in "Howard history" and is presented by the fictional British character, Sir Hardin Thicke, voiced by voice-over actor Mike Pollock.

The show is a production of "The Tapes Team" at SIRIUS, along with Stern Spotlight, Mammary Lane and The History of Howard Stern.

See also
Mammary Lane
Stern Spotlight
The History of Howard Stern

References

External links
Howard 100 Channel Guide
Sirius Howard 100
Howard Stern’s Official Website
Stern Fan Network
Sirius Backstage's Howard Stern Forum
DawgSaloon

Sirius Satellite Radio
2006 radio programme debuts
Howard Stern